Ludlow railway station in Ludlow, Shropshire, England, lies on the Welsh Marches Line between Shrewsbury  to the north and Hereford. The station is on Station Drive,  to the northeast of Ludlow town centre.

History
The station opened on 21 April 1852, as the southern terminus of the first section of the Shrewsbury and Hereford Railway. Trains travelling to or from the south of the station pass through the short Ludlow Tunnel ( long), which passes under Gravel Hill and has its tunnel entrance immediately south of the platforms. A quarter of a mile to the north of the station was Clee Hill Junction, where from 1864 to 1962 a branch line ran to the quarries in the nearby Clee Hills to the east of Ludlow.

The engine shed closed in 1951 and the goods yard on 6 May 1968. In the late 1960s, the Victorian buildings at the station were demolished and the last signal boxes closed.

Stationmasters

Hugh Morgans from 1852  (formerly goods manager at Conway)
Charles Allen ca. 1854 - ca. 1860
Richard Edwards ca. 1864 - ca. 1871
Martin Charles Tidmarsh ca. 1877 - 1882 (afterwards station master at Hereford)
Henry Hughes ca. 1884 - ca. 1898 
Arthur Frederick Stringer ca. 1903 - ca. 1921
Edward Harrington 1924 - 1932 (from 1902 goods agent at Ludlow, from 1924 both roles combined)
Henry Edward Jones 1932 - 1942
Arthur Parry from 1942 
Wilfred Henry P Glaswardine 1949 - 1952 (formerly station master at Welshpool)
Henry N. Duce ca. 1956

Accidents and incidents
At 3.15 am on 6 September 1956, a northbound parcels train overran signals and ran into the rear of a Penzance to Manchester express passenger train carrying 150 passengers but caused no deaths and only one serious shock casualty. The passenger train had halted because a lorry that had crashed into a level crossing at Onibury station had blocked the track.

Passenger services
Passenger services are currently provided by Transport For Wales. The station is served by one to two trains per hour in each direction Mondays to Saturdays, and around fifteen trains each way on Sundays. The only passenger services running on the line that do not call at Ludlow are the two North-South Wales express services that run Monday to Friday in each direction.

Ludlow is the fourth busiest station by passenger numbers in Shropshire after Shrewsbury, Telford Central and Wellington.

Facilities and access

There are two platforms — platform 1 is the northbound platform (for Shrewsbury) and platform 2 is the southbound platform (for Hereford). Whilst there is level access to the ticket office and platform 1, the footbridge can only be reached by steps from that platform, and level access to platform 2 is via a ramp down from Quarry Gardens; a long path provides a level access route that runs over the tunnel entrance between the platforms.

Facilities include a staffed ticket office (where railway-related books and light refreshments are available to buy), car parking, weatherproof platform shelters, and an accessible adapted toilet. The station is served by Ludlow's two frequent 'town' bus services, the 701 and 722.

The goods shed (on the former goods yard that closed in 1968) adjacent to the railway line to the north of Station Drive is now home to the Ludlow Brewery. It has been renovated and is open to the public, with information on local railway history.

See also
Railways of Shropshire

References

Further reading

External links

South Shropshire Access Group — information about disabled access in Ludlow (PDF link)

Railway stations in Shropshire
DfT Category E stations
Former Shrewsbury and Hereford Railway stations
Railway stations in Great Britain opened in 1852
Railway stations served by Transport for Wales Rail
Ludlow
1852 establishments in England